Majemite Omagbaluwaje (born 10 June 1969) is a Nigerian judoka. He competed at three Olympic Games.

Achievements

References

External links

1969 births
Living people
Nigerian male judoka
Olympic judoka of Nigeria
Judoka at the 1988 Summer Olympics
Judoka at the 1992 Summer Olympics
Judoka at the 2000 Summer Olympics
Judoka at the 1990 Commonwealth Games
Commonwealth Games silver medallists for Nigeria
Commonwealth Games bronze medallists for Nigeria
Commonwealth Games medallists in judo
African Games medalists in judo
Competitors at the 1991 All-Africa Games
Competitors at the 1999 All-Africa Games
African Games gold medalists for Nigeria
African Games bronze medalists for Nigeria
20th-century Nigerian people
21st-century Nigerian people
Medallists at the 1990 Commonwealth Games